Wayne Ferreira won in the final 6–4, 6–7(3–7), 6–1, against Richey Reneberg.

Seeds

Draw

Finals

Top half

Bottom half

External links
 ITF tournament edition details

Singles